Notarius armbrusteri is a species of catfish in the family Ariidae. It was described by Ricardo Betancur-Rodríguez and Arturo Acero Pizarro in 2006. It inhabits marine waters around Buenaventura, Valle del Cauca, in Colombia.

The species epithet "armbrusteri" was given in honour of Jonathan W. Armbruster, a curator at the Auburn University Museum, whom the authors credited with providing important contributions to the taxonomy of catfish in neotropical regions.

References

Ariidae
Fish described in 2006